James Heseltine (also spelled Hesletine; c. 1690 – 20 June 1763) was organist of Durham Cathedral.

Life
Heseltine was a pupil of John Blow at the Chapel Royal in London, leaving the chapel choir when his voice broke in 1707. Early in the century he was organist at St Katharine's by the Tower, in London. In January 1711 he was elected organist of Durham Cathedral, retaining his London appointment.

He composed anthems and other works, but because of a misunderstanding between him and the dean and chapter of the cathedral, he destroyed a large part of them. However six were published in A Collection of Anthems (1749).

In 1730 Heseltine married Frances, daughter of George Wheler, canon of Durham. He remained as organist of the cathedral until his death in 1763. He was buried in the Galilee chapel of the cathedral. His pupil Thomas Ebdon succeeded him as organist.

His wife predeceased him, and there were no children; his property was claimed by a nephew and niece in America.

References

External links
 "Mr. James Heseltine (oil on canvas)" at Bridgeman Art Library

1690 births
1763 deaths
18th-century keyboardists
English classical organists
British male organists
18th-century classical composers
18th-century British male musicians
Musicians from County Durham
Male classical organists
Cathedral organists